The 1997 Giro di Lombardia was the 91st edition of the Giro di Lombardia cycle race and was held on 18 October 1997. The race started in Varese and finished in Bergamo. The race was won by Laurent Jalabert of the ONCE team.

General classification

References

1997
Giro di Lombardia
Giro di Lombardia
Giro Di Lombardia
October 1997 sports events in Europe